The 1945 Great Lakes Navy Bluejackets football team represented the Great Lakes Navy Training Station during the 1945 college football season.  The team compiled a 6–4–1 record, and outscored their opponents 221 to 164.  Coached by the legendary Paul Brown, the Bluejackets started the season with a 0–4–1, suffering from a loss of talent as many players were shifted to the west coast to help close the pacific theater of World War II, but once the war ended many men from overseas returned to the boot camp, and the team managed to win their final six games, culminating in a 39–7 defeat of top 5 Notre Dame at home.

Schedule

References

Great Lakes Navy
Great Lakes Navy Bluejackets football seasons
Great Lakes Navy Bluejackets football